Arkan is a popular circle dance of the Ukrainian Hutsul people (from Hutsulshchyna, southwestern Ukraine). The word literally means lasso, borrowed from the Turkish language.

The Arkan is traditionally performed around a burning bonfire by the men. 

The word Arkan also refers to the step that the men perform while dancing around the fire. The step begins with the right foot stepping to the side (or double stamping as the dance builds momentum), the left foot crosses behind, the right foot steps to the side again, and the left foot is hopped in front of the dancer with a bent knee. The dance is performed with the men's arms upon one another's shoulders. In professional Ukrainian dances, however, many variations may accompany this root step.

An element of the rite of initiation of a 20-year-old Hutsul youth into a lehin (after passing the rite, he was given the right to dance, carry a shepherd's axe, kill enemies and gird himself with a wide belt, i.e., he became a potential opryshok).

There is also a Romanian dance called Arcan.

British folk-punk band The Ukrainians have a track called Arkan on their Respublika album.

See also
 Arcan (dance)

References

External links 
Performances by dance troupes
 Vesnianka
 Barvinok
 Rosi Svitanku

Arkan
Hutsuls
Ukrainian folk dances
Ukrainian-Canadian culture
Ukrainian words and phrases